Mahendra Shrikantha Perera (born 17 August 1956), is an actor in Sri Lankan cinema, stage drama and television. One of the most influential actors in Sinhala cinema, Mahendra performed from drama to comedy in many blockbuster films.

Personal life
He was born on 17 August 1956 in Mount-Lavinia, Sri Lanka as the youngest of the family. His father Vincent Perera, was a store manager at the Browns, and his mother Soma Weerasekera, was a matron at several government hospitals. He has two older sisters, Priyanthi Damayanthi and shivanthi Kalyani. He first studied at Highland College, Nugegoda. Later he went to Maharagama Vidyakara College and Thurstan College, Colombo.

He is married to Thakshila Damayanthi, daughter of Mr.Nandadasa- a decorated financial advisor. The couple has three sons, Uvin, Navin and Ishanka – all Wesleyites. The eldest son, Uvin works in the tourism industry. Naven is currently residing in Australia while the Youngest, Ishanka works as an Interior Architect.

Career
During his life at Thurstan, he met a friend called Kalani Perera, who later became a violinist. They both studied music under the music teacher Yogananda Wijesundera where Mahendra learned violin, water wave, tabla and xylophone. After school life, he joined a rock band in Mount Lavinia and played guitar. When his father did not succeed his intentions, Mahendra ran away from home and planted potatoes with a cousin in Haputale. During this period, he met the writer and lecturer, Upul Shantha Sannasgala. Meanwhile, the father came to Haputale brought Mahendra back to Colombo.

After return home, he joined Dhamma Jagoda's theater classes and learned acting. However, after few monthns, he clashed with Dhamma saying it was boring only to learn acting in 'Sinhabahu' and 'Maname'. Then he went to a drama course conducted by Dr. Solomon Fonseka and learned the theatrical techniques introduced by the Russian playwright Konstain Stanislavsky. Meanwhile, his first stage play was Ahimi Jeevitha staged in Lionel Wendt. Mahendra met with Arisen Ahubudu who first introduced him to Gamini Fonseka. His maiden cinematic experience came through 1978 film Sakwithi Suwaya directed by Gamini Fonseka and played the role ‘Berty Malli’. Under Helena Lehthimaki, he followed a three-year course during which they did Punthila.

Then Mahendra played powerful roles in Shakespeare's plays Julius Caesar and Gimhane Reyaka Sihinayak produced by Tony Ranasinghe. During the same time, he acted in the blockbuster film Sagarayak Meda. He also appeared in several stage plays including Ath, Ahimi Jeevitha and Sergeant Nallathambi. His maiden television acting came through Tharadevi. Since then, he acted in the serials such as Sudu Saha Kaḷu, Niyan Ukussō, Dhavala Rāthriya, Diya Kæṭa Pahaṇa, Hadavila Sakmana, Daṇḍē Lū Gini, Diyasēna, Vesmuhuṇu and Golu Thaththa.

However his most notable appearances came through cinema, where he continued to be one of the most influential cinema actors in Sinhala cinema. He dominated many blockbusters such as Sihina Dēśayen, Asvæsuma, Bahubūthayō, Sudu Kaḷu, Arumōsam Væhi, Mille Soyā, Adḍress Nǣ, Kosthāpal Puñyasōma, 28 and Gindari. He won a merit award for the role in the serial Diyaketa Pahana. Apart from acting, Perera also worked as the art director in the film Julietge Bhumikawa and Pawuru Walalu. He was also the assistant director of the film Koti Waligaya.

Selected television serials

 Abuddassa Kalaya
 Amuthu Minissu
 Ath Kanda Lihiniya
 Bhavathra
 Charithayakata Paata Denna
 Dadakeli Arana
 Deyyo Sakki
 Dhawala Kanya 
 Diya Matha Ruwa 
 Duvili Maliga
 Ekama Raene Kurullo
 Gini Avi Saha Gini Keli
 Golu Thaththa (2016)
 Herda Sakshiya
 Hiru Thanivela
 Ingammaruwa
 Itu Devi Vimana
 Jeewithaya Dakinna 
 Kampitha Vil
 Maama Haa Ma
 Mage Kaviya Mata Denna 
 Mahamera Paamula
 Me Sonduru Piyapath
 Nethra Mangallaya
 Pata Veeduru
 Pinkanda Simona 
 Ralla Veralata Adarei
 Samartha
 Sanda Amawakai
 Sanda Nathi Reya
 Satharadenek Senpathiyo 
 Sathyaya 
 Sisila Ima
 Star Sri lanka Histhanak
 Sulanga Matha Mohothak (2013 - 2014)
 Thalaya Soyana Geethaya
 Thattu Gewal
 Uththamavi
 Wanawadule Wasanthaya
 Weda Hamine
 Yakada Pahanthira

Filmography
{| class="wikitable"
|-
! Year !! Film !! Role !! Ref.
|-
|1981
|Sagarayak Mada
|First entrance prisoner
|
|-
|1982
|Sakwithi Suwaya
|Bertie 'Malli'
|
|-
|1982
|Ridee Nimnaya
|Newton
|
|-
|1986
|Koti Waligaya
|
|
|-
|1991
|Keli Madala
|Wijesiri
|
|-
|1993
|Guru Gedara
|'England Ambassador' actor
|
|-
|1993
|Nelum Saha Samanmali
|787
|
|-
|1995
|Maruthaya
|
|
|-
|1996
|Sihina Deshayen
|
|
|-
|1997
|Sudu Akka
|
|
|-
|1997
|Visidela
|Sumith
|
|-
|1997
|Gini Avi Saha Gini Keli
|Sammy
|
|-
|1998
|Anthima Reya
|
|
|-
|1998
|Julietge Bhumikawa
|Supun. also as art director.
|
|-
|1999
|Pawuru Walalu
|Anthony
|
|-
|1999
|Surayahana Gini Gani
|
|
|-
|1999
|Surangana Yahana
|
|
|-
|1999
|Mandakini
|
|
|-
|2000
|Saroja
|Sirisena
|
|-
|2000
|Sanda Yahanata
|
|
|-
|2000
|Anuragaye Ananthaya
|Terrance
|
|-
|2001
|Aswesuma
|Head hunter
|
|-
|2001
|Purahanda Kaluwara
|Village officer
|
|-
|2002
|Bahubuthayo
|Lanty
|
|-
|2002
|Mage Wam Atha
|Photographer
|
|-
|2002
|Arumosam Wahi
|Bindu
|
|-
|2003
|Thani Thatuwen Piyabanna
|Mechanic
|
|-
|2003
|Sonduru Dadabima
|Ranasinghe
|
|-
|2003
|Bheeshanaye Athuru Kathawak
|
|
|-
|2003
|Sudu Salu
|Bandu 
|
|-
|2004
|Mille Soya
|Pradeep
|
|-
|2004
|Randiya Dahara
|Kulatunga
|
|-
|2005
|Sulanga Enu Pinisa
|Soldier
|
|-
|2005
|Sudu Kalu Saha Alu
|Army Ajith
|
|-
|2005
|Asani Warsha
|Patrick Bappa
|
|-
|2008
|Puthuni Hambagiya
|Michael
|
|-
|2008
|Machan
|Ruan
|
|-
|2008
|Heart FM
|Media Manager
|
|-
|2008
|Siri Raja Siri
|Gune, Sirimal's father
|
|-
|2010
|Bambara Walalla
|Mel
|
|-
|2010
|Ira Handa Yata
|Nimal
|
|-
|2010
|Thank You Berty
|Sanda's father
|
|-
|2010
|How I Wonder What You Are
|
|
|-
|2011
|King Hunther
|Hector
|
|-
|2011
|Gamani
|Mahendra
|
|-
|2012
|Super Six
|Madaya
|
|-
|2012
|Matha
|Galariya
|
|-
|2012
|Kusa Pabha
|Royal Servant
|
|-
|2013
|Bomba Saha Rosa
|Gotta
|
|-
|2013
|Abhinikmana
|Somadasa
|
|-
|2014
|Kosthapal Punyasoma
|Kosthapal Punyasoma
|
|-
|2014
|Ko Mark No Mark
|Prof. Amaraweera
|
|-
|2015
|Pravegaya
|Mahen
|
|-
|2015
|Spandana
|Mahendra Sami
|
|-
|2015
|Gindari
|Lanty
|
|-
|2015
|Address Na
|Chaplin
|
|-
|2016
|Hora Police
|Seargent Suwandarathna / Tiger
|
|-
|2016
|Motor Bicycle
|Manju
|
|-
|2017
|Sulanga Gini Aran
|Human organ trafficker
|
|-
|2017
|28
|Abasiri
|
|-
|2017
|Appata Siri
|Mahamudalige Ranaweera / Suraweera
|
|-
|2017
|Kaala
|Heen Kurutta Nilame
|
|-
|2018
|Vaishnavee
|Simon
|
|-
| 2018
| Punchi Andare
|Anadare's Father
|
|-
| 2018
|Davena Vihagun
|Slaughter house owner
|
|-
| 2018
|Athuru Mithuru Hari Apuru
|
|
|-
|2019
|Weli Pawuru
|Sisira Ekanayake
|
|-
|2019
|President Super Star
|Vijitha Mapalagama
|
|-
|2022
|Night Rider
|
|
|-
|2022
|Gindari 3
|Lanty
|
|-
|TBD
|Theja
|
|
|-
|TBD
|Kondadeniye Hamuduruwo
|
|
|-
|TBD
|Anora
|
|
|-
|TBD
|Girivassipura
|Pilimathalawwe
|
|-
|TBD
| Ragaya Viragaya
|
|
|-
| TBD 
| 1970 Love Story
|
|
|-
|TBD
|Hora Uncle
|
|
|-
|TBD
|Ayyai Nangyi
|
|
|-
|TBD
|Adventures of Ricky Deen
|Ricky Deen
|
|-
|TBD
|Gindari 2
|Lanty
|
|-
|TBD
|Hithumathe Jeewithe
|Raja
|
|-
|TBD
|Kidnap'''
|Upali
|
|-
|TBD
|Passport|
|
|-
|TBD
|Kathuru Mithuru|Wilson 'barber'
|
|-
|TBD
|Vedi Nowadina Lamai|
|
|-
|TBD
|Maria|
|
|-
|TBD
|Number 9|
|
|}

Awards and accolades
He has won several awards at the local cinema, stage drama festivals and television festivals.

Sarasaviya Awards

|-
|| 2006 ||| Randiya Dahara || Best Supporting Actor ||  

Presidential Film Awards

|-
|| 2006 ||| Asani Warsha'' || Best Supporting Actor ||

References

External links 
 
 http://www.asiapacificscreenacademy.com/nomsarchive/mahendra-perera/
 
 ජනප්‍රිය නළු මහේන්ද්‍ර පෙරේරා රසවත් කතාබහක..

Sri Lankan male film actors
Sri Lankan male television actors
Sinhalese male actors
Living people
1956 births